Soroti University (SUN), is a public multi-campus university in Uganda. It is one of the nine public universities and degree-awarding institutions in the country.

Location
The coordinates of the campus of Soroti University are 1°45'56.0"N, 33°3'44.0"E (Latitude:1.765543; Longitude:33.628900).

History
The government of Uganda, following lobbying by stakeholders from the Teso sub-region, decided in 2012 to establish a public university in Soroti District. A five-person task-force, headed by founding vice chancellor Robert Ikoja, was named by the Uganda minister of education in September 2012 to prepare for the opening of the university. Soroti University was expected to open in August 2013. In that month, however, the Daily Monitor, a Ugandan daily newspaper, revealed that members charged with the establishment of the public Soroti University had also been establishing Teso University, a private institution.

Construction of the university's main building began in June 2014 with completion expected 24 months later. In June 2015, the government of Uganda, officially created Soroti University as a public institution, when the minister of Education, Science and Technology and Sports, Jessica Alupo, introduced a Statutory Instrument followed by a resolution of Parliament to the same effect.

As of February 2018, the pioneer class of students were expected to begin classes in August 2018. After delays, the university admitted the first cohort of students on 17 August 2019.

Schools
As of January 2018, the university maintained the following schools and institutions:
 School of Medicine and Health Sciences
 Institute of Gastronomy and Culinary Sciences
 School of Engineering and Technology
 School of Applied Sciences and Education
 School of Business Sciences and Economics

Academic courses
The following academic courses are on offer:
 Bachelor of Medicine and Bachelor of Surgery
 Bachelor of Science in Biomedical Sciences
 Bachelor of Science in Nursing Science
 Bachelor of Science in Biomedical Laboratory Technology
 Bachelor of Science in Biomedical Engineering
 Bachelor of Dentistry
 Bachelor of Pharmacy
 Diploma in Pharmacy
 Bachelor of Science in Gastronomy and Culinary Sciences
 Bachelor of Science in Computer Engineering
 Bachelor of Science in Physical Engineering
 Bachelor of Science in Electrical Engineering
 Bachelor of Science in Electronic Engineering
 Bachelor of Science in Civil Engineering
 Bachelor of Science in Mechatronics Engineering
 Bachelor of Science in Mechanical Engineering
 Bachelor of Engineering in Aeronautical Engineering
 Bachelor of Science with Education (Physics, Chemistry, Mathematics, Economics, Biology, Computer Science and Physical Education)
 Bachelor of Science in Mathematics
 Bachelor of Science in Multimedia Technology and Design
 Bachelor of Science in Accounting, Finance & Computing
 Bachelor of Science in Economics

See also
 Education in Uganda
 List of universities in Uganda
 Eastern Region, Uganda
 List of university leaders in Uganda

References

External links
 Soroti University key for the 2016 general election in Teso
  University, Locals Lock Horns Over Soroti Land
 Soroti University Drops Land Claim

 
Soroti
Teso sub-region
Educational institutions established in 2015
Public universities
2015 establishments in Uganda
Engineering universities and colleges in Uganda